Julia Anna Margareta Engström  (born 27 March 2001) is a Swedish professional golfer. A golf prodigy, she became the youngest winner of the British Ladies Amateur, at age 15. She won twice on the Ladies European Tour as a teenager, and was the 2018 LET Rookie of the Year. At 21, she retired due to spinal injuries.

Amateur career
Engström was introduced to golf by her parents aged two, and she had her first golf set at age four. Watching the 2007 Solheim Cup take place in her home town of Halmstad at age six inspired her, and by the age of thirteen she was a scratch player.

In 2014, at age 13, Engström made her debut appearance on the Ladies European Tour after receiving an invitation to play in the Helsingborg Open at Vasatorp Golf Club. Linda Wessberg, member of the 2007 Solheim Cup European team, was at the time out of action with a broken arm, and acted as her mentor.

In 2016, at age 15, Engström became the youngest player to win the British Ladies Amateur Golf Championship, earning her starts at the 2016 U.S. Women's Open, the 2016 Women's British Open, and the 2016 Evian Championship.

Professional career

LET Success
In December 2017, aged 16, Engström qualified for the 2018 Ladies European Tour. She finished 17th on the Order of Merit and won the 2018 LET Rookie of the Year award. She won her first event as a professional at the 2018 Ladies Finnish Open, and followed it up with winning the 2018 LET Access Series season finale at El Prat, Spain.

Engström ended the 2019 season strongly, finishing top five in three of the last five tournaments. At the Magical Kenya Ladies Open in December she held a seven stroke lead going into the final round, but finished third after a final round of 74. She soon made a redemption for her loss however, as she overcame a five-shot deficit coming into the final round at the Women's NSW Open in March 2020 to clinch her maiden LET victory by two strokes. With the victory Engström moved to the top of the Race to Costa Del Sol leaderboard.

Engström secured her second LET victory of 2020 at the Lacoste Ladies Open de France, after carding a hole-in-one en route to a second round 64 (−7). With the win she moved to the top of the LET 2021 Solheim Cup Points leaderboard, just ahead of Christine Wolf and Emily Kristine Pedersen. With her two victories, Engström finished second in the 2020 LET Order of Merit, behind Pedersen.

Injury
Engström then suffered a spinal disc herniation and was sidelined for the entire 2021 season due to her injury. Attempting a comeback in 2022, she finished tied 11th at the Amundi German Masters, before succumbing to her ongoing injury. In early 2023, at age 21, she announced an indefinite timeout from golf, and a plan to attend law school at Stockholm University.

Amateur wins
2013 Skandia Cup Riksfinal F13
2014 Finnish International Junior Championship F14, Skandia Cup Riksfinal F14, Skandia Tour Elit Girls #3, 
2016 British Ladies Amateur

Source:

Professional wins (4)

Ladies European Tour wins (2) 

^Co-sanctioned with the ALPG Tour

LET Access Series wins (2)

Results in LPGA majors
Results not in chronological order before 2018.

DNP = did not play
CUT = missed the half-way cut

Team appearances
Amateur
Junior Vagliano Trophy: (representing the Continent of Europe): 2015 (winners)
Junior Ryder Cup (representing Europe): 2016
Junior Solheim Cup (representing Europe): 2017
Vagliano Trophy (representing the Continent of Europe): 2017 (winners)
European Girls' Team Championship (representing Sweden): 2017 (winners)

Professional
European Championships (representing Sweden): 2018

References

External links

Swedish female golfers
Ladies European Tour golfers
Winners of ladies' major amateur golf championships
Sportspeople from Skåne County
People from Lomma Municipality
Sportspeople from Halmstad
2001 births
Living people